Morrow Creek is a river located in Tompkins County, New York. It flows into Cayuga Lake by Lake Ridge, New York.

Rivers of Tompkins County, New York
Rivers of New York (state)